Harvey Edward Glance (born March 28, 1957) is a former American sprint runner. He won gold medal in 4 × 100 m relay at the 1976 Olympics, 1987 World Championships, and 1979 and 1987 Pan American Games.

Track and field career

Glance equaled the then 100 m world record of 9.9 twice in 1976: first on April 3 in Columbia and then a month later in Baton Rouge. As an Auburn University student, Glance won the NCAA 100 m championships in 1976 and 1977 and 200 m championships in 1976. In 1976, he also recorded the automatic timings of 10.12 s and 10.11 s that were world junior records for 100 m.

Glance finished first in the 100 m at the 1976 USA Olympic Trials. @ 28:15
At the 1976 Montreal Olympics, Glance was a disappointing fourth in 100 m, as the United States failed to win a medal in the event. He then ran the opening leg in the gold medal winning American 4 × 100 m relay team. At the 1979 Pan American Games, Glance was second in 100 m and won the gold medal as a member of American 4 × 100 m relay team. He was also second in 4 × 100 m relay at the 1979 Athletics World Cup. Glance was also in line to replace James Sanford in the individual 100 m race if Sanford had not recovered in time from a muscle injury.

Glance again qualified for the team for the Olympic team for the 1980 Moscow Olympics, finishing second in the 100 m. However, due to the boycott, he did not compete at the Olympics but competed in the Liberty Bell Classic (Olympic Boycott Games) instead, winning silver in the 100 m and gold in the relay. He was a recipient of one of 461 Congressional Gold Medals created especially for the spurned athletes. He also won the gold medal at the 1985 Athletics World Cup, 1987 Pan American Games and 1987 World Championships as a member of the American 4 × 100 m relay teams.

Track coach career

He worked first as assistant coach at Auburn University (1990–91) and then became their head coach.

In 1997, he became head track and field coach at the University of Alabama. While there, he established the 'Crimson Tide' as one of the USA's best college teams, and was able to attract many top athletes to the university including Kirani James (World 400 m champion in 2011 and Olympic 400 m champion in 2012).

At the national level, Glance assumed the following roles:

 1994 – World Junior Team in Lisbon, Portugal;
 1997 – World University Games in Sicily, Italy;
 1999 – Pan American Games in Winnipeg, Canada;
 2003 – assistant coach for Team USA at the 2003 World Championships in Paris, France;
 2006 – World junior Team in Beijing, China;
 2008 – assistant coach for Team USA at the 2008 Olympic Games;
 2009 – men's head coach for Team USA at the 2009 World Championships in Berlin, Germany.

In recognition of his achievements, in 1996 he was inducted into the Alabama Sports Hall of Fame, and, most notably, he received in 2008 the Congressional Gold Medal of Freedom.

In April 2011, Glance announced he was to retire from his role at Alabama at the end of the season. Since retiring, Glance has continued to work as the personal coach of Kirani James, assisting in his rise to become Olympic champion.

Personal life

Glance was born in Phenix City, Alabama, the son of Mr and Mrs Wheller Glance. and was educated at Central High School in Phenix City. There he was mentored in track by his high school drivers’ education teacher, Joe Henderson, who had recognised Glance's special talent.

After high school, he earned a degree in Health & Human Performance at Auburn University.

Glance always recognized his potential as a coach and volunteered to work as one in Arizona whilst still an athlete. Always aware of the importance of public relations and civic responsibility, Glance was a regular visitor as a student to a veterans hospital and was selected as one of five student-athletes from the 1976 Olympics team to be invited to an NCAA Honors Luncheon with the President of the United States. His coach, the well-renowned Mel Rosen, was proud to state "Harvey's what I call world-class – as an athlete and as a man."

Rankings

Glance was ranked among the best in the US and the world in both the 100 and 200 m sprint events over the incredible spread of 12 seasons from 1976 to 1987, according to the votes of the experts of Track and Field News.

Notes

References

External links

T&FN Interview: Harvey Glance, Jon Henderschott, Track and Field News, June 1976.

1957 births
American male sprinters
African-American male track and field athletes
Athletes (track and field) at the 1976 Summer Olympics
Athletes (track and field) at the 1979 Pan American Games
Athletes (track and field) at the 1987 Pan American Games
Auburn Tigers track and field coaches
Auburn Tigers men's track and field athletes
Living people
Medalists at the 1976 Summer Olympics
Olympic gold medalists for the United States in track and field
Sportspeople from Columbus, Georgia
Pan American Games gold medalists for the United States
Pan American Games silver medalists for the United States
Pan American Games medalists in athletics (track and field)
People from Phenix City, Alabama
World Athletics Championships medalists
World Athletics Championships athletes for the United States
Congressional Gold Medal recipients
Universiade medalists in athletics (track and field)
Track and field athletes from Alabama
Goodwill Games medalists in athletics
Alabama Crimson Tide track and field coaches
Universiade bronze medalists for the United States
World Athletics Championships winners
Medalists at the 1977 Summer Universiade
Competitors at the 1986 Goodwill Games
Medalists at the 1979 Pan American Games
Medalists at the 1987 Pan American Games
21st-century African-American people
20th-century African-American sportspeople